, better known by the pen name Yū Asagiri ( or  Asagiri Yū), was a female Japanese manga artist from Tokyo, Japan. She made her professional manga debut in 1976. Asagiri received the 1987 Kodansha Manga Award for shōjo for Nanairo Magic ("Seven Colors Magic"). She died on 27 October 2018 from severe pneumonia.

Works
Asagiri started her career in 1978 drawing shōjo manga in Kodansha's Nakayoshi magazine. In the mid-1990s, she switched to josei manga, and to boy's love manga. She also provided illustrations for boy's love novels.

Shojo manga
 Aoi Uchuu no Runa  (Nakayoshi, 1978, 1 volume)
 Hanashishuu Kodemari ni Yosete (Nakayoshi, 1978, 1 volume)
 Watashi no Koi wa Hoshi Makase (Nakayoshi, 1980, 1 volume)
 Kirara Hoshi no Daiyogen (Nakayoshi, 1981, 2 volumes). Story by Kyoko Mizuki.
 Aitsu ga Hero! (Nakayoshi Deluxe, 1981–82, 2 volumes)
 Ashita Kara no Hero (Nakayoshi Deluxe, 1984, 1 volume)
 Kocchi Muite Love! (Nakayoshi, 1982–83, 4 volumes)
 Apple Dream (Nakayoshi, 1984–85, 3 volumes)
 Akogare Boukensha (Nakayoshi, 1985–86, 3 volumes)
 Nanairo Magic (Nakayoshi, 1987–88, 6 volumes)
 Ai Boy (Nakayoshi, 1988–90, 5 volumes)
 Sotsugyou Shashin (Nakayoshi Deluxe, 1988, 1 volume)
 Minmin! (Nakayoshi, 1990–93, 5 volumes)
 Kon na Panic (Nakayoshi, 1991–92, 5 volumes)
 Himawari Nikki (Nakayoshi, 1991, 1 volume)
 Alice no Jikan (Nakayoshi Deluxe, 1991–92, 1 volume)
 Onnanoko no Fushigi (Shōjo Friend, 1990, 1 volume)
 Onnanoko no Ho-n-ki (Shōjo Friend, 1991, 1 volume)
 Kurenai Densetsu (Shōjo Friend, 1991, 4 volumes)
 Kyasshu na Kankei (Shōjo Friend, 1993, 4 volumes)
 Yume de Aetar (Shōjo Friend, 1995, 2 volumes)
 Oneesan no Jijou (Bessatsu Friend, 1994, 1 volume)
 B.B. Tengoku (Bessatsu Friend, 1995, 2 volumes)
 Eve no Subete (1994, 1 volume)

Josei manga
 Midnight Panther (Gakken's Monthly Comic Nora, 1994–97, 23 volumes).

Boy's love manga
 Knock o 3-kai (Houbunsha's Hanaoto, 1995, 1 volume)
 Second Love (Hanaoto, 1997, 2 volume2)
 Lonely Soldier (1998, 1 volume)
 Gogo no Ihoujin (Be x Boy, 1999, volume)
 Lover's Kiss (1999, 1 volume)
 Miserarete (2000, 1 volume)
 Hitomi no Honne (2001, 1 volume)
 Hitomi no Giwaku (2002, 1 volume)
 Kin no Cain (Golden Cain) (2003, 1 volume)
 Joouheika no Oniwaban (2004, 1 volume. Re-edited by Libre in 2009 
 Mr. Secret Floor series (Be x Boy Gold, 2010-ongoing, 5 volumes)
 Mr. Secret Floor - Shousetsuka no Tawamure na Hibiki (2011)
 Mr. Secret Floor - Honoo no Ouji (2012)
 Mr. Secret Floor - Sabaku no Kaori no Otoko (2013)
 Mr. Secret Floor - Gunpuku no Koibito (2015)
 Mr. Secret Floor - Boku wo Kurau Kemono no Kagayaki (2016)

Illustration books
 In the 2 decades Asagiri Yu Illustration Collection (1997, Gakken).

References

External links 
 Official page (in Japanese)
 
 Profile at The Ultimate Manga Guide 

1956 births
2018 deaths
Women manga artists
Manga artists from Tokyo
Winner of Kodansha Manga Award (Shōjo)
Hentai creators
Japanese female comics artists
Female comics writers
20th-century Japanese women writers
20th-century Japanese writers
21st-century Japanese women writers
Deaths from pneumonia in Japan
Pseudonymous women writers
Pseudonymous artists
20th-century pseudonymous writers
21st-century pseudonymous writers